This page lists the rosters, by season, of the UCI Women's Team, WM3 Pro Cycling.

2016

2015

As of 1 January 2016. Ages as of 1 January 2016.

2014

Ages as of 1 January 2014

2013

2012

Ages as of 1 January 2012.

2011

Ages as of 1 January 2011.

References

Lists of cyclists by team